Marco Cheung Chun Hin (born 7 January 1999) is a Hong Kong professional footballer who currently plays as a defender for Hong Kong Premier League club HK U23.

References

External links
 HKFA
 

1999 births
Living people
Hong Kong footballers
Association football defenders
Happy Valley AA players
HK U23 Football Team players
Hong Kong Premier League players
Hong Kong First Division League players